The canton of Nuits-Saint-Georges is an administrative division of the Côte-d'Or department, eastern France. Its borders were modified at the French canton reorganisation which came into effect in March 2015. Its seat is in Nuits-Saint-Georges.

It consists of the following communes:
 
Agencourt
Arcenant
Argilly
Barges
Boncourt-le-Bois
Broindon
Chaux
Comblanchien
Corcelles-lès-Cîteaux
Corgoloin
Épernay-sous-Gevrey
Flagey-Echézeaux
Fussey
Gerland
Gilly-lès-Cîteaux
Magny-lès-Villers
Marey-lès-Fussey
Meuilley
Noiron-sous-Gevrey
Nuits-Saint-Georges
Premeaux-Prissey
Quincey
Saint-Bernard
Saint-Nicolas-lès-Cîteaux
Saint-Philibert
Saulon-la-Chapelle
Saulon-la-Rue
Savouges
Villars-Fontaine
Villebichot
Villers-la-Faye
Villy-le-Moutier
Vosne-Romanée
Vougeot

References

Cantons of Côte-d'Or